Nick Jr. is an Asian cable TV channel aimed at younger children, operated by Paramount Networks EMEAA and owned by Paramount International Networks.

On 20 December 2010, Nick Jr. was launched in New Zealand on Sky TV, almost 4 months before its official launch in Asia.

History
Nick Jr. along with MTVNHD was launched in New Zealand on 20 December 2010 and in Asia on 18 May 2011. It was promoted on Nickelodeon. The channel is available on StarHub TV in Singapore, Unifi TV and Astro in Malaysia, SKY TV in New Zealand, SkyCable and Cablelink in the Philippines, and on myTV SUPER, Now TV and Cable TV Hong Kong in Hong Kong.

MTV Asia was broadcasting in New Zealand before Nick Jr. Nickelodeon previously broadcast in New Zealand from 2000 to 2006. Nick Jr. officially launched in New Zealand on 20 December 2010. Its high definition channel is broadcast in Southeast Asia and selected regions.

Since 2021, Nick Jr. replaces in most of its channel lineups, especially its rival channel Disney Junior that was shut down in the same year.

Programming

Current programming

Original programming
 Baby Shark's Big Show!
 Blue's Clues & You!
 Blaze and the Monster Machines
 Bubble Guppies
 Santiago of the Seas

Acquired programming
 The Adventures of Paddington
 Anna & Friends
 Barbapapa: One Big Happy Family!
 Deer Squad
 PAW Patrol
 Peppa Pig

Future programming
 Bossy Bear
 Hamsterdale
 Rubble & Crew
 The Tiny Chef Show

Former programming

Original programming

 The Backyardigans (2010–2015)
 Ben & Holly's Little Kingdom (2012–2018)
 Blue's Clues (2010–2014)
 Butterbean's Café (2019–2022)
 Dora the Explorer (2010–2022)
 Dora and Friends: Into the City! (2015–2017)
 Fresh Beat Band of Spies (2016–2017)
 Go Diego Go! (2010–2016)
 Nella the Princess Knight (2017-2020)
 Ni Hao, Kai-Lan (2011–2016)
 Ready Set Dance! (2020–2022)
 Shimmer & Shine (2016–2020)
 Sunny Day (2018–2019)
 Team Umizoomi (2010-2018)
 Wallykazam (2017–2019)
 Wonder Pets (2010–2015)

Acquired programming

 Abby Hatcher (2019–2021)
 Julius Jr. (2014)
 Kid-E-Cats (2017–2019)
 Kiva Can Do! (2018–2019)
 Little Charmers (2015–2018)
 Louie (2011–2017)
 Max & Ruby (2010–2021)
 Olive the Ostrich (2011-2017)
 Roary the Racing Car (2010–2016)
 Rusty Rivets (2016-2020)
 Tickety Toc (2013–2016)
 Top Wing (2018–2021)
 The Day Henry Met (2017–2018)
 Wanda and the Alien (2015–2017)
 Yo Gabba Gabba!
 Zack & Quack (2014–2020)

See also
 Nickelodeon
 Nick Jr.
 Nickelodeon Philippines

References

External links
 Official site

Southeast Asia
Children's television channels in the Asia Pacific
Mass media in Southeast Asia
Television channels and stations established in 2010
English-language television stations in New Zealand
2010 establishments in New Zealand
Television stations in Singapore
Television stations in the Philippines
Television stations in Malaysia
Television stations in Indonesia
Television channels in Brunei
Television stations in Thailand
Television stations in Taiwan
Television stations in Hong Kong
Television stations in Sri Lanka
Television channels in Myanmar
Television stations in Macau
2011 establishments in Singapore
2011 establishments in Malaysia
2011 establishments in the Philippines
2011 establishments in Indonesia
2011 establishments in Brunei
2011 establishments in Thailand
2011 establishments in Myanmar
2011 establishments in Hong Kong
2011 establishments in Macau
2011 establishments in Taiwan
2011 establishments in Sri Lanka